Chris Hamilton (born 13 July 2001) is a Scottish professional footballer who plays for Dunfermline Athletic as a defensive midfielder.

Early life
Hamilton grew up as a Dunfermline Athletic fan.

Club career
Hamilton moved from Crossgates Primrose to  Heart of Midlothian at the age of 8.

He made his senior debut for Hearts on 13 May 2018, in a 1–0 league defeat away at Kilmarnock. He was one of four Hearts youth players to make their debuts in that match, alongside Cammy Logan, Leeroy Makovora and Connor Smith. 

Hamilton joined Scottish League One side Dumbarton on loan in September 2020. Hamilton scored his first senior goal for the Sons on his full debut, in a 3–2 defeat to Clyde on 10 October 2020, a match in which he was also sent off. On 8 January 2021, Hamilton joined Scottish League Two side Stirling Albion on loan for the remainder of the 2020–21 season.

In July 2021 he was loaned to Scottish Championship club Arbroath.

In June 2022 Hamilton signed for his boyhood club Dunfermline Athletic on a long term deal. He was named vice captain as the season began.

International career
Hamilton was captain of the Scotland under-16 Victory Shield squad. He has also represented Scotland at under-17, under-18, under-19 and under-21 youth levels.

Selected for the Scotland under-21 squad in the 2018 Toulon Tournament, the team lost to Turkey in a penalty-out and finished fourth.

Career statistics

References

2001 births
Living people
Scottish footballers
Scotland youth international footballers
Scotland under-21 international footballers
Crossgates Primrose F.C. players
Heart of Midlothian F.C. players
Scottish Professional Football League players
Association football midfielders
Berwick Rangers F.C. players
Cowdenbeath F.C. players
Dumbarton F.C. players
Stirling Albion F.C. players
Arbroath F.C. players
Dunfermline Athletic F.C. players